Vachellia seyal, the red acacia, known also as the shittah tree (the source of shittim wood), is a thorny,  6– to 10-m-high (20 to 30 ft) tree with a pale greenish or reddish bark. The blossoms are displayed in round, bright yellow clusters about  diameter.

In Vachellia seyal var. fistula, which is more common on heavy clay soils, some of the thorns are swollen and house symbiotic ants.

It is distributed from Egypt to Kenya and west Senegal. In the Sahara, it often grows in damp valleys. It is also found at wadis on the Arabian Peninsula.

Varieties 
Two varieties are recognized:
 Vachellia seyal var. fistula (Schweinf.) Kyal. & Boatwr.
 Vachellia seyal var. seyal (Delile) P.J.H.Hurter

Hybrids 
Vachellia seyal occasionally hybridizes with V. xanthophloea.

Uses

Gum arabic 
Vachellia seyal is, along with other Vachellias, an important source for gum arabic, a natural polysaccharide, that exudes from damaged stems and solidifies.
The gum of V. seyal is called gum talha, from Arabic  ṭalḥ, a term for any fruiting tree.

Tanning 
Parts of the tree have a tannin content up to 18-20%. The bark and seed pods of V. seyal var. seyal have a tannin content around 20%.

Wood 
Wood from the tree is said to have been used in Ancient Egypt to make coffins and also the Ark of the Covenant.

Medicinal uses

Bark 
The bark is used to treat dysentery and bacterial infections of the skin, such as leprosy. It is also used as a stimulant.

Gum 
The gum is used as an aphrodisiac, to treat diarrhoea, as an emollient, and to treat hemorrhaging, inflammation of the eye, intestinal ailments, and rhinitis. It is used to ward off arthritis and bronchitis.

Wood 
Incense from the wood is used to treat pain from rheumatism and to keep expectant mothers from contracting rhinitis and fevers.

See also
 Talhah (name)

References 

 Arbonnier, M. Arbres, arbustes et the lianes zones seches d'Afrique de l'Ouest. CIRAD. Montpellier, 2000 

seyal
Flora of West Tropical Africa
Flora of North Africa
Flora of Morocco
Flora of Egypt
Flora of Eritrea
Flora of Saudi Arabia
Flora of Sudan
Trees of the Arabian Peninsula
Flora of Syria
Flora of Senegal
Trees of Africa
Flora of Western Sahara
Flora of Uganda